Earlston Joseph Harris (born 3 November 1952) is a Saint Kitts born former English cricketer.  Harris was a right-handed batsman who bowled right-arm medium pace.  He was born in Lodge Village, Saint Kitts.

Harris made his first-class debut for Warwickshire against Oxford University in 1975.  He made three further first-class appearances for the county in 1975, the last of which came against Kent in the County Championship.  In his four first-class matches, he scored a total of 26 runs at an average of 8.66, with a high score of 16.  With the ball, he took 9 wickets at a bowling average of 32.77, with best figures of 3/66.

References

External links
Earl Harris at ESPNcricinfo
Earl Harris at CricketArchive

1952 births
Living people
Kittitian cricketers
English cricketers
Warwickshire cricketers